Sounds Familyre Records  is an independent record label based in Clarksboro, New Jersey, started and managed by Danielson founder Daniel Smith, who created the label in 1999.

Artists

 Sufjan Stevens
 Danielson
 Half-handed Cloud
 Soul-Junk
 Bifrost Arts
 Steve Taylor and the Danielson Foil
 Ortolan
 Wovenhand
 Ben + Vesper
 Leopulde
 The Singing Mechanic
 Dan Zimmerman
 I Was a King
 Jørn Åleskjær
 Octagrape

See also
 Danielson

External links
 
 
 Official site
 Sounds Familyre Records on MySpace
 Sounds Familyre Imprint

American independent record labels
Record labels established in 1999
1999 establishments in New Jersey